The Elector Bible is a German language folio-sized, Martin Luther translation of the Bible (Old and New Testament) that was authorized by Ernest I, Duke of Saxe-Gotha and printed by Wolfgang Endter in Nuremberg, Germany from 1641 to 1758. Other names for this Bible are the Weimar Bible and the Ernestine Bible.

The earliest known edition to have survived to this day is the Detmold edition printed in 1649. There were 14 editions of this Bible.

References

Early printed Bibles